The 2006 World Senior Curling Championships were held from March 4 to 11 at the Tårnby Curling Club in Copenhagen, Denmark.

Group A of each gender consisted of the best ranked countries from the previous year. The three best teams of the A-groups advanced to the semi finals as well as the winner of the B-groups. The top ranked team in A will play against the top ranked team in B, the winner went on to the gold medal game and the loser went on to the bronze medal game. The 2nd place team in A played against the 3rd place team in A, and the winner went on to the gold medal game and the loser went on to the bronze medal game.

Men

Teams

Round robin

Group A

Group B

  Teams to playoffs

Playoffs

Semi-finals
March 10, 16:30

Bronze medal game
March 11, 10:00

Final
March 11, 14:00

Final standings

Women

Teams

Round robin

Group A

Group B

  Teams to playoffs
  Teams to tiebreaker

Tiebreaker
March 10, 8:30

Playoffs

Semi-finalsMarch 10, 16:30

Bronze medal gameMarch 11, 10:00

FinalMarch 11, 14:00

Final standings

References

External links

World Senior Curling Championships 2006 - Tårnby Curling Club

World Senior Curling Championships
World Senior Curling Championships
World Senior Curling Championships
International curling competitions hosted by Denmark
Sports competitions in Copenhagen
World Senior Curling Championships